Type 31 may refer to:

Type 31 frigate, a proposed frigate class of the Royal Navy
Type 31 75 mm mountain gun, a field gun of the Imperial Japanese Army
a version of the M2 mortar produced in the Republic of China
Type 31 Grampus I, a variant of the Bristol Grampus, an early British prototype aircraft
Villiers 31, an early French passenger aircraft
Tupolev Tu-85, a Soviet prototype aircraft, designated as Type 31 by the US Air Force
Hispano-Suiza Type 31, an early Spanish aircraft engine
Peugeot Type 31, an early French motor vehicle
an early Datsun motor vehicle
Type 31 Alphabetical Duplicating Punch, an IBM keypunch